Nasrettin is a village in the Karacabey district, Bursa Province, Turkey.

References 

Villages in Karacabey District